Sören Axel Wibe (8 October 1946 – 29 December 2010) was a European economist and eurosceptic politician, born in Östersund. He was a Social Democratic Member of the European Parliament (MEP) 1995–1999, member of the Riksdag 2002–2006, and who since 6 July 2008 was party leader of the June List. In January 2009 he was elected President of the EUDemocrats - Alliance for a Europe of Democracies, a eurorealist European political party with members from 15 European countries.

Wibe was professor of forest industrial economics at the Swedish University of Agricultural Sciences in Umeå. He has been one of the most prominent and vocal EU critics in the Social Democratic Party. In April 2008, he announced his resignation from the party citing a number broken promises over EU policy and rulings in the European Court of Justice, which he alleged would lead to a weakening of the trade unions' position and limitations on strike actions in Sweden. Wibe was also actively involved in the European No Campaign against the proposed European Constitution.

Shortly after leaving the Social Democrats, he was nominated as one of two new party leaders for the June List together with Annika Eriksson. In January 2009, Eriksson left her post, after which Wibe was the lone leader of the party and its top candidate for the European elections 2009.

Wibe died on 29 December 2010 in Umeå after a short illness.

Bibliography
 Miljöeffekter av skattereformen (1990)
 Samhällsekonomiska aspekter på ekonomisk brottslighet (1991)
 Maktens geografi : statliga kommittéers regionala sammansättning (1991)
 Marknaden för skogsbränsle : en analys av hur marknaden för skogsbränsle påverkar skogsindustrins råvaruförsörjning (1992)
 Långtidsutredningen 1992 (1992)
 Forests : market and intervention failures : five case studies (1992)
 Economic growth and the environment (1994)
 Non wood benefits in forestry : survey of valuation studies (1994)
 Är tillväxten exponentiell? (1994)
 EU problem för svensk ekonomi (1994)
 Struktur och produktivitetsutveckling inom svensk industri 1970/1990 (1995)
 Efterfrågan på tyst boende (1997)
 "Vaxholmsfallet och den svenska modellen" : en kort beskrivning av bakgrund, argument och sakläge (2006)
 Etanolens koldioxideffekt : en översikt av forskningsläget (2010)

References 

1946 births
2010 deaths
June List politicians
Leaders of political parties in Sweden
Members of the Riksdag 2002–2006
Members of the Royal Swedish Academy of Agriculture and Forestry
Academic staff of Umeå University
Swedish Social Democratic Party MEPs
MEPs for Sweden 1995–1999